This partial lunar eclipse was visible on 31 December 2009. It was the last and largest of four minor lunar eclipses in 2009. This lunar eclipse is also notable, because it occurred during a blue moon (a second full moon in December). The next eclipse on New Year's Eve and blue moon will occur on 31 December 2028.

Only a small portion of the Moon entered the Earth's umbral shadow, but there was a distinct darkening visible over the Moon's southern surface at greatest eclipse.

Visibility 

It was visible from all of Africa, Europe, Asia, Middle East and Australia. In the Philippines, the lunar eclipse was started last 1 January 2010, when it was very visible at mid-dawn until before sunrise.

Map

Photos 
Progression from Degania A, Israel

Related eclipses

Eclipses of 2009 
 An annular solar eclipse on 26 January
 A penumbral lunar eclipse on 9 February
 A penumbral lunar eclipse on 7 July
 A total solar eclipse on 22 July
 A penumbral lunar eclipse on 6 August
 A partial lunar eclipse on 31 December

Lunar year (354 days) 
This eclipse is the one of four lunar eclipses in a short-lived series. The lunar year series repeats after 12 lunations or 354 days (Shifting back about 10 days in sequential years). Because of the date shift, the Earth's shadow will be about 11 degrees west in sequential events.

Saros series 
It was part of Saros series 115.

Half-Saros cycle
A lunar eclipse will be preceded and followed by solar eclipses by 9 years and 5.5 days (a half saros). This lunar eclipse is related to two partial solar eclipses of Solar Saros 122.

Tritos series
 Preceded: Lunar eclipse of January 31, 1999
 Followed: Lunar eclipse of November 30, 2020

Tzolkinex 
 Preceded: Lunar eclipse of November 20, 2002
 Followed: Lunar eclipse of February 11, 2017

See also 
 List of lunar eclipses
 List of 21st-century lunar eclipses
 :File:2009-12-31 Lunar Eclipse Sketch.gif Chart

References

External links
 
 Hermit eclipse: 2009-12-31
  Eclipse enthusiasts in Europe, Africa, Australia and Asia can celebrate New Year's Eve by observing a partial lunar eclipse on December 31, 2009. The event's duration will be about four hours.

2009-12
2009 in science
December 2009 events